Khachaturian, Khachaturyan, Khachadurian or Khachatourian is an Armenian surname meaning "cross bearer". People with the name include the following:
 Leon Khachatourian (born 1936), Iranian Armenian boxer
 Aram Khachaturian (1903–1978), Soviet Armenian composer
 Emin Khachaturian (1930–2000), Armenian conductor and composer
 Gayane Khachaturian (1942–2009), Soviet and Armenian painter
 Karen Khachaturian (1920–2011), Soviet and Russian composer
 Ontronik Khachaturian (born 1975), American musician
 Andrey Khachaturyan (born 1987), Belarusian footballer
 Artur Khachaturyan (born 1992), Armenian basketball player

See also 
 Khachatryan

Armenian-language surnames